Georgiopolis, Greek for 'city of Georgios [George]', may refer to :

 the Byzantine name of ancient Lydda, which is the present-day Lod in Israel
 a 2009 publication on the early work of half-Jewish art photographer Dor Guez, whose mother was a Palestinian Christian from that city